This is a list of cities in Argentina.

List of Argentine cities

Over 150,000 inhabitants

45,000 to 150,000 inhabitants 
This is a list of the localities of Argentina of 45,000 to 150,000 inhabitants ordered by amount of population according to the data of the 2001 INDEC Census.

 San Nicolás de los Arroyos (Buenos Aires) 133,602
 San Rafael (Mendoza) 104,782
 Rafael Castillo (Buenos Aires) 103,992
 Trelew (Chubut) 103,305
 Santa Rosa (La Pampa) 101,987
 Tandil (Buenos Aires) 101,010
 Villa Mercedes (San Luis) 97,000
 Puerto Madryn (Chubut) 93,995
 Morón (Buenos Aires) 92,725
 Virrey del Pino (Buenos Aires) 90,382
 Caseros (Buenos Aires) 90,313
 San Carlos de Bariloche (Río Negro) 90,000
 Maipú (Mendoza) 89,433
 Zárate (Buenos Aires) 86,686
 Burzaco (Buenos Aires) 86,113
 Pergamino (Buenos Aires) 85,487
 Grand Bourg (Buenos Aires) 85,159
 Monte Chingolo (Buenos Aires) 85,060
 Olavarría (Buenos Aires) 83,738
 Rawson (San Juan) 83,605
 Rafaela (Santa Fe) 82,530
 Junín (Buenos Aires) 82,427
 Remedios de Escalada (Buenos Aires) 81,465
 La Tablada (Buenos Aires) 80,389
 Río Gallegos (Santa Cruz) 79,072
 Campana (Buenos Aires) 77,838
 Presidencia Roque Sáenz Peña (Chaco) 76,377
 Rivadavia (San Juan) 75,950
 Florida (Buenos Aires) 75,891
 Villa Madero (Buenos Aires) 75,582
 Olivos (Buenos Aires) 75,527
 Gualeguaychú (Entre Ríos) 74,681
 Villa Gobernador Gálvez (Santa Fe) 74,658
 Villa Luzuriaga (Buenos Aires) 73,952
 Boulogne Sur Mer (Buenos Aires) 73,496
 Chimbas (San Juan) 73,210
 Ciudadela (Buenos Aires) 73,155
 Luján de Cuyo (Mendoza) 73,058
 Ezpeleta (Buenos Aires) 72,557
 Villa María (Córdoba) 72,162
 General Roca (Río Negro) 69,602
 San Fernando (Buenos Aires) 69,110
 Ciudad Evita (Buenos Aires) 68,650
 Venado Tuerto (Santa Fe) 68,508
 Bella Vista (Buenos Aires) 67,936
 Luján (Buenos Aires) 67,266
 San Ramón de la Nueva Orán (Salta) 66,579
 Cipolletti (Río Negro) 66,472
 Goya (Corrientes) 66,462
 Reconquista (Santa Fe) 66,187
 Wilde (Buenos Aires) 65,881
 Martínez (Buenos Aires) 65,859
 Necochea (Buenos Aires) 65,459
 Don Torcuato (Buenos Aires) 64,867
 Banda del Río Salí (Tucumán) 64,591
 Concepción del Uruguay (Entre Ríos) 64,538
 General Rodríguez (Buenos Aires) 63,317
 Villa Tesei (Buenos Aires) 63,164
 Ciudad Jardín El Libertador (Buenos Aires) 61,780
 Villa Carlos Paz (Córdoba) 60,900
 Sarandí (Buenos Aires) 60,725
 Villa Elvira (Buenos Aires) 59,476
 Villa Domínico (Buenos Aires) 58,824
 Béccar (Buenos Aires) 58,811
 San Francisco (Córdoba) 58,588
 Glew (Buenos Aires) 57,878
 Punta Alta (Buenos Aires) 57,296
 El Palomar (Buenos Aires) 57,146
 Rafael Calzada (Buenos Aires) 56,419
 Tartagal (Salta) 55,508
 San Pedro de Jujuy (Jujuy) 55,084
 Belén de Escobar (Buenos Aires) 55,054
 Mariano Acosta (Buenos Aires) 54,081
 San Francisco Solano (Buenos Aires) 53,363
 Los Polvorines (Buenos Aires) 53,354
 Azul (Buenos Aires) 53,054
 Chivilcoy (Buenos Aires) 52,938
 Lomas del Mirador (Buenos Aires) 52,971
 Río Grande (Tierra del Fuego) 52,786
 Guernica (Buenos Aires) 52,529
 General Pico (La Pampa) 52,414
 Mercedes (Buenos Aires) 51,967
 Bosques (Buenos Aires) 51,663
 Oberá (Misiones) 51,681
 Barranqueras (Chaco) 50,738
 Yerba Buena 50,057
 Villa Centenario (Buenos Aires) 49,737
 San Martín (Mendoza) 49,491
 Gobernador Julio A. Costa (Buenos Aires) 49,291
 William Morris (Buenos Aires) 48,916
 El Jagüel (Buenos Aires) 48,781
 Villa Mariano Moreno (Tucumán) 48,655
 Eldorado (Misiones) 47,794
 Longchamps (Buenos Aires) 47,622
 Clorinda (Formosa) 46,884
 Viedma (Río Negro) 46,767
 Concepcion (Tucumán) 46,194
 Tres Arroyos (Buenos Aires) 45,986
 Ushuaia (Tierra del Fuego) 45,205
 San Isidro (Buenos Aires) 45,190
 Palpala (Jujuy) 45,077

Alphabetical order by province

Buenos Aires Province 

 Adolfo Gonzales Chaves, Buenos Aires
 Alejandro Korn
 América
 Arrecifes
 Avellaneda
 Azul
 Bahía Blanca
 Balcarce
 Banfield
 Béccar
 Benito Juárez
 Berazategui
 Berisso
 Bragado
 Buenos Aires
 Burzaco
 Campana
 Cariló
 Carmen de Areco
 Carmen de Patagones
 Chacabuco
 Chivilcoy
 Ciudadela
 Ciudad Jardín Lomas del Palomar
 Colonia Lapin
 Coronel Martínez de Hoz
 Coronel Pringles
Dolores
 El Palomar
 Ensenada
 Ezeiza
 Florencio Varela
 Florida Este
 General Alvear
 General Las Heras
 General Lavalle
 General Rodríguez
 General Villegas
 Guaminí
 Hurlingham
 Ingeniero Maschwitz
 Ituzaingó
 José C. Paz
 Junín
 La Lucila
 Lanús
 La Plata
 Las Flores
 Leandro N. Alem
 Lobos
 Lomas de Zamora
 Luján
 Mar del Plata
 Martínez
 Merlo
 Miramar
 Monte Grande
 Morón
 Munro
 Necochea
 Nueve de Julio
 Olavarría
 Olivos
 Parque San Martín
 Pehuajó
 Pergamino
 Pigüé
 Pilar
 Pinamar
 Rafael Calzada
 Quilmes
 San Antonio de Padua
 San Fernando
 San Isidro
 San Justo
 San Miguel del Monte
 San Nicolás de los Arroyos
 Santos Lugares
 Sarandí
 Tandil
 Tigre
 Trenque Lauquen
 Tres Arroyos
 Tres de Febrero
 Valentín Alsina
 Villa Gesell
 Villa Fiorito
 Villa Martelli
 Villa Mercedes
 Zárate

Catamarca 

 San Fernando del Valle de Catamarca
 Andalgalá
 Belén
 San Isidro
 Santa María
 Saujil
 Tinogasta

Chaco 

 Resistencia
 Barranqueras
 Castelli
 Charata
 General José de San Martín
 General Pinedo
 Presidencia Roque Sáenz Peña
 Villa Ángela

Chubut 

 Rawson
 Comodoro Rivadavia
 Dolavon
 Esquel
 Gaiman
 Puerto Madryn
 Puerto Pirámides
 Rada Tilly
 Sarmiento
 Trelew
 Trevelin

Córdoba 

 Córdoba
 Alta Gracia
 Arias
 Arroyito
 Bell Ville
 Canals
 Capilla del Monte
 Colonia Caroya
 Cosquín
 Cruz del Eje
 Ischilín
 James Craik
 Jesús María
 La Carlota 
 La Cumbre
 La Cumbrecita
 La Falda
 Laboulaye
 Laguna Larga
 Las Varillas
 Leones
 Levalle
 Mina Clavero
 Miramar
 Morteros
 Oncativo
 Quilino
 Río Cuarto
 Río Segundo
 Río Tercero
 San Francisco del Chañar
 San Francisco
 Santa Rosa de Calamuchita
 Tanti
 Unquillo
 Valle Hermoso
 Vicuña Mackenna
 Villa Carlos Paz (or just Carlos Paz)
 Villa Cura Brochero
 Villa del Totoral
 Villa General Belgrano
 Villa María

Corrientes 

 Corrientes (Capital)
 Alvear
 Bella Vista
 Curuzú Cuatiá
 Empedrado
 Esquina
 Gobernador Virasoro
 Goya
 Itatí
 Ituzaingó
 Paso de los Libres
 Santo Tomé
 Saladas
 Santa Lucía
 Sauce

Entre Ríos 

 Paraná
 Basavilbaso
 Chajarí
 Colón
 Concepción del Uruguay
 Concordia
 Crespo
 Diamante
 Federación
 Gualeguay
 Gualeguaychú
 La Paz
 Larroque
 Libertador San Martín 
 Puiggari
 San José
 Urdinarrain
 Victoria
 Villa Elisa
 Villa Paranacito
 Villaguay

Formosa 

 Formosa
 Clorinda
 Ibarreta
 Las Lomitas
 Puerto Pilcomayo

Jujuy 

 San Salvador de Jujuy
 General San Martín
 Humahuaca
 León
 La Quiaca
 San Pedro
 Tilcara

La Pampa 

 Santa Rosa
 Eduardo Castex
 General Pico
 Guatraché
 Macachín
 Realicó
 Santa Isabel

La Rioja 

 La Rioja
 Aimogasta
 Anillaco
 Chepes
 Chilecito
 El Chamical
 Famatina
 Patquía
 Villa Unión

Mendoza 

 Mendoza
 General Alvear
 Godoy Cruz
 La Paz
 Luján de Cuyo
 Malargüe
 Palmira
 Puente del Inca
 Punta de Vacas
 Rivadavia
 San Martín
 San Rafael
 Tunuyán
 Tupungato
 Uspallata

Misiones 

 Posadas
 Andresito
 Apóstoles
 Bernardo de Irigoyen
 Candelaria
 Eldorado
 Montecarlo
 Oberá
 Puerto Iguazú

Neuquén 

 Neuquén
 Aluminé
 Centenario
 Chos Malal
 Cutral Có
 Junín de los Andes
 Loncopué
 Piedra del Águila
 Plottier
 San Martín de los Andes
 Villa La Angostura
 Zapala

Río Negro 

 Viedma
 Choele Choel
 Cipolletti
 El Bolsón
 General Roca
 Ingeniero Jacobacci
 San Antonio Oeste
 San Carlos de Bariloche
 Sierra Grande
 Villa Regina

Salta 

 Salta
 Cachi
 Cafayate
 General Güemes
 Salvador Mazza
 San Antonio de los Cobres
 San Ramón de la Nueva Orán
 Tartagal

San Juan 

 San Juan
 Calingasta
 Caucete
 San José de Jáchal
 Villa Media Agua
 Zonda
 Albardón
 9 de Julio
 Villa Krawse
 Villa Paula Albarracín de Sarmiento
 Aberastain

San Luis 

 San Luis
 Merlo
 La Punta
 San Francisco del Monte de Oro
 El Trapiche
 Villa Mercedes

Santa Cruz 

 Comandante Luis Piedrabuena
 Puerto Santa Cruz
 Caleta Olivia
 El Calafate
 El Chaltén
 Gobernador Gregores
 Los Antiguos
 Pico Truncado
 Puerto Deseado
 Puerto San Julián
 Río Gallegos
 Río Turbio

Santa Fe 

 Santa Fe
 Cañada de Gómez
 Carlos Pellegrini
 Coronda
 Esperanza
 Funes
 Frontera
 Rafaela
 Reconquista
 Rosario
 Rufino
 San Carlos Centro
 San Lorenzo
 Santo Tomé
 Sauce Viejo
 Sunchales
 Venado Tuerto
 Villa Cañás
 Villa Constitución

Santiago del Estero 

 Santiago del Estero
 Añatuya
 Frías
 Isca Yacu
 La Banda
 Loreto
 Río Hondo

Tierra del Fuego 

 Ushuaia
 Río Grande
 Tolhuin

Tucumán 

 San Miguel de Tucumán
 Aguilares
 Banda del Río Salí
 Concepción
 Famaillá
 Lules
 Monteros
 Simoca
 Tafí del Valle
 Tafí Viejo
 Yerba Buena

See also 
 List of cities in Argentina by population
 List of cities
 List of cities in South America

References

Further reading

External links 
 

 
Argentina, List of cities in
Argentina
Argentina
Cities
Cities in Argentina